Joachim Wundrak (born on 28 May 1955 in Kerpen, Germany) is a German retired Lieutenant General and politician for the AfD, who has been a member of the Bundestag, the federal diet since 2021 German federal election.

References 

Living people
1955 births
Members of the Bundestag for Lower Saxony
Members of the Bundestag 2021–2025
Members of the Bundestag for the Alternative for Germany

German Air Force pilots
21st-century German politicians
People from Kerpen
Military personnel from North Rhine-Westphalia